The Book of the Hanging Gardens, Op. 15, is a fifteen-part song cycle composed by Arnold Schoenberg between 1908 and 1909, setting poems of Stefan George. George's poems, also under the same title, track the failed love affair of two adolescent youths in a garden, ending with the woman's departure and the disintegration of the garden. The song cycle is set for solo voice and piano. The Book of the Hanging Gardens breaks away from conventional musical order through its usage of atonality. 

The piece was premiered by Austrian singer Martha Winternitz-Dorda and pianist Etta Werndorf on January 14, 1910, in Vienna.

Biographical and cultural context
The Book of the Hanging Gardens served as the start to the atonal period in Schoenberg's music. Atonal compositions, referred to as "pantonal" by Schoenberg, typically contain features such as a lack of central tonality, pervading harmonic dissonance rather than consonance, and a general absence of traditional melodic progressions. This period of atonality became commonly associated with the expressionist movement, despite the fact that Schoenberg rarely referred to the term "expressionism" in his writings. Whether or not he wanted to be associated with the movement, Schoenberg expresses an unambiguous positivity with his discovery of this new style in a program note for the 1910 first performance of The Book of the Hanging Gardens:

Schoenberg's libretto transcends the tragic love poems of George and become a deeper reflection of Schoenberg's mood during this period when viewing his personal life. The poems tell of a love affair gone awry without explicitly stating the cause of its demise. In 1908, Schoenberg's wife Mathilde left him and their two children for Richard Gerstl, a painter with whom Schoenberg was a close friend and for whom Mathilde often modeled. She returned to the family from her flight with Gerstl eventually, but not before Schoenberg discovered the poems of George and began drawing inspiration from them.

Structure

Although the 15 poems do not necessarily describe a story or follow a linear development, the general subjects can be grouped as follows: a description of the paradise (poems 1 and 2), the paths that the lover takes to reach his beloved (poems 3–5), his passions (poems 6–9), the peak of the time together (poems 10–13), premonition (poem 14), and finally, love dies away and Eden is no more (poem 15).

{| class="wikitable"
!
!First line of each poem (Original German)
!Approximate English translation
|----
|1
|Unterm Schutz von dichten Blättergründen
|Under the shade of thick leaves
|----
|2
|Hain in diesen Paradiesen
|Groves in this paradise
|----
|3
|Als Neuling trat ich ein in dein Gehege
|As a novice, I entered your enclosure
|----
|4
|Da meine Lippen reglos sind und brennen
|Because my lips are motionless and burning
|----
|5
|Saget mir auf welchem Pfade
|Tell me on which paths
|----
|6
|Jedem Werke bin ich fürder tot
|To everything else I am henceforth dead
|----
|7
|Angst und Hoffen wechselnd sich beklemmen
|Fear and hope alternately oppress me
|----
|8
|Wenn ich heut nicht deinen Leib berühre
|If I today do not touch your body
|----
|9
|Streng ist uns das Glück und spröde
|Strictness to us is happiness, and brittle
|----
|10
|Das schöne Beet betracht ich mir im Harren
|I looked at the beautiful [flower] bed while waiting
|----
|11
|Als wir hinter dem beblümten Tore
|As we behind the flowered gates
|----
|12
|Wenn sich bei heilger Ruh in tiefen Matten
|If it with sacred rest in deep mats 
|----
|13
|Du lehnest wider eine Silberweide
|You lean against a white willow
|----
|14
|Sprich nicht mehr von dem Laub
|Say no more of the foliage
|----
|15
|Wir bevölkerten die abend-düstern Lauben
|We occupied the night-gloomy arcades
|----
|}

Critical reception
Upon its initial debut in 1910, The Book of the Hanging Gardens was not critically acclaimed or accepted in mainstream culture. Hanging Gardens complete lack of tonality was initially disdained. Although a limited number of his works, including The Book of the Hanging Gardens, had been played in Paris since 1910, there was little attention from the French press for Schoenberg's music in general. The reviews received elsewhere were usually scathing. One New York Times reviewer in 1913 went so far as to call Schoenberg "A musical anarchist who upset all of Europe."

Deemed the Second Viennese School, Schoenberg and his students Anton Webern and Alban Berg helped to make Hanging Gardens and works like it more acceptable. By the 1920s, a radical shift had occurred in the French reception of Schoenberg, his Hanging Gardens, and atonality in general. "For progressives, he became an important composer whose atonal works constituted a legitimate form of artistic expression."

Critical analysis
Alan Lessem analyzes the Book of the Hanging Gardens in his book Music and Text in the Works of Arnold Schoenberg. However, how to interpret the work remains debated. Lessem maintained that the meaning of the song cycles lay in the words, and one critic finds his proposed relation of words and music fits Hanging Gardens better than the other songs treated in his book, and speculates that this may be because the theory was originally inspired by this cycle. Lessem treats each interval as a symbol: "cell a provides material for the expression of poignant anticipations of love, cell b of frustrated yearnings" ...the structure of [the] cycle may, viewed as a whole, give the impression of progression through time, but this is only an illusion. The various songs give only related aspects of a total, irredeemable present."

Moods are conveyed though harmony, texture, tempo, and declamation. The 'inner meaning,' if in fact there is to be found, is the music itself, which Lessem already described in great detail.

Anne Marie de Zeeuw has examined in detail the "three against four" rhythm of the composition's opening and its manifestation elsewhere in the work.

The garden as a metaphor
As argued in Schorske's groundbreaking study of Viennese society, the Book of the Hanging Gardens uses the image of the garden as a metaphor of the destruction of traditional musical form. The garden portrayed in George's poem, which Schoenberg puts to music, represent the highly organized traditional music Schoenberg broke away from. Baroque geometric gardens made popular during the Renaissance were seen as an "extension of architecture over nature." So too did the old order of music represent all that was authority and stable. The destruction of the garden parallels the use of rationality to break away from the old forms of music.

References

Sources
 Brown, Julie (1994). "Schoenberg's Early Wagnerisms: Atonality and the Redemption of Ahasuerus". Cambridge Opera Journal 6, no. 1 (March): 51–80.
 
 Dick, Marcel (1990). "An Introduction to Arnold Schoenberg's The Book of Hanging Gardens, op. 15". In Studies in the Schoenbergian Movement in Vienna and the United States: Essays in Honor of Marcel Dick, edited by Anne Trenkamp and John G. Suess, 235–39. Lewiston, NY: Mellen Press. 
 Domek, Richard C. (1979). "Some Aspects of Organization in Schoenberg's Book of the Hanging Gardens, opus 15". College Music Symposium 19, no. 2 (Fall): 111–28.
 Dümling, Albrecht (1981). Die fremden Klänge der hängenden Gärten. Die offentliche Einsamkeit der Neuen Musik am Beispiel von A. Schoenberg und Stefan George. Munich: Kindler. 
 Dümling, Albrecht (1995). "Öffentliche Einsamkeit: Atonalität und Krise der Subjektivität in Schönbergs op. 15". In Stil oder Gedanke? Zur Schönberg-Rezeption in Amerika und Europa, edited by Stefan Litwin and Klaus Velten. Saarbrücken: Pfau-Verlag.
 Dümling, Albrecht (1997): "Public Loneliness: Atonality and the Crisis of Subjectivity in Schönberg's Opus 15". In: Schönberg and Kandinsky. An Historic Encounter, edited by Konrad Boehmer, 101-38. Amsterdam: Harwood Academic Publishers. 
 Evans, Richard (1980). [Review of Lessem 1979]. Tempo: A Quarterly Review of Modern Music 132 (March): 35–36.
 Huneker, James (1913). "Schoenberg, Musical Anarchist Who Has Upset Europe". New York Times (January 19): magazine section part 5, page SM9, 4055 words
 Lessem, Alan Philip (1979). Music and Text in the Works of Arnold Schoenberg: The Critical Years, 1908–1922. Studies in Musicology 8. Ann Arbor: UMI Research Press.  (cloth);  (pbk)
 Médicis, François de (2005). "Darius Milhaud and the Debate on Polytonality in the French Press of the 1920s". Music & Letters 86, no. 4:573–91.
 Puffett, Derrick (1981). [Review of Lessem 1979]. Music & Letters 62, no. 3 (July–October): 404–406.
 Reich, Willi (1971). Schoenberg: A Critical Biography, trans. Leo Black. London: Longman; New York: Praeger. . Reprinted 1981, New York: Da Capo Press. 
 Schäfer, Thomas (1994). "Wortmusik/Tonmusik: Ein Beitrag zur Wagner-Rezeption von Arnold Schönberg und Stefan George". Die Musikforschung 47, no. 3:252–73.
 Schorske, Carl (1979). Fin-de-siècle Vienna: Politics and Culture, first edition. New York: Knopf; London: Weidenfeld and Nicolson. 
 Smith, Glenn Edward (1973). "Schoenberg's Book of the Hanging Gardens: An Analysis". DMA diss. Bloomington: Indiana University, 1973.

External links

 in Stefan George: . Complete works, vol. 3, Berlin 1930

Atonal compositions by Arnold Schoenberg
Song cycles by Arnold Schoenberg
1909 compositions
Classical song cycles in German